Pelocharis is a genus of ground beetles in the family Carabidae. This genus has a single species, Pelocharis remyi. It is found in Sri Lanka.

References

Trechinae
Monotypic Carabidae genera